Perry Township is one of thirteen townships in Tippecanoe County, Indiana, United States. As of the 2010 census, its population was 7,161 and it contained 2,782 housing units.

History
Hershey House was listed on the National Register of Historic Places in 1978.

Geography

Cities, towns, villages
 Lafayette (east edge)

Unincorporated communities
 Heath at 
 Meadowbrook at 
 Monitor at 
 Pettit at 
(This list is based on USGS (United States Geological Survey) data and may include former settlements.)

Adjacent townships
 Washington Township (north)
 Clay Township, Carroll County (east)
 Ross Township, Clinton County (east)
 Madison Township, Clinton County (southeast)
 Sheffield Township (south)
 Wea Township (southwest)
 Fairfield Township (west)

Cemeteries
The township contains these three cemeteries: Swank, Union and Zion.

Major highways
  Interstate 65

Airports and landing strips
 Halsmer Airport
 Wildcat Air Landing Area

School districts
 Tippecanoe School Corporation

Political districts
 Indiana's 4th congressional district
 State House District 41
 State Senate District 22

References
 United States Census Bureau 2007 TIGER/Line Shapefiles
 United States Board on Geographic Names (GNIS)
 United States National Atlas

External links
 Indiana Township Association
 United Township Association of Indiana

Townships in Tippecanoe County, Indiana
Lafayette metropolitan area, Indiana
Townships in Indiana